Charles Jones (22 November 1911 – 4 June 1985) was a Welsh professional footballer who played for Ebbw Vale, Northfleet United, Tottenham Hotspur and Southend United.

Football career 
After initially playing for Ebbw Vale, Jones joined the Tottenham Hotspur "nursery" team Northfleet United. The centre half signed for Tottenham Hotspur in 1934, making his debut against Leeds United at White Hart Lane on 22 December 1934, and played a total of 18 matches for the Spurs. In May 1937 Jones made his debut for Southend United and went on to make 26 appearances and scoring twice in all competitions before the outbreak of World War II during which he served as a seaman in the RNPS.

References 

1911 births
1985 deaths
Welsh footballers
English Football League players
Tottenham Hotspur F.C. players
Southend United F.C. players
Colchester United F.C. players
Association football central defenders
Ebbw Vale F.C. players
Northfleet United F.C. players